Vinicio Marchioni (born 10 August 1975) is an Italian actor. He appeared in more than thirty films since 2006.

Selected filmography

References

External links 

1975 births
Living people
Italian male film actors
People of Calabrian descent